Dana L. Redd (born March 7, 1968) is an American Democratic politician who served as the Mayor of Camden, from 2010 to 2018. Redd served in the New Jersey Senate from January 8, 2008, to January 5, 2010, representing the 5th Legislative District.

Education
Redd graduated from Bishop Eustace Preparatory School in 1986 and began full-time employment while attending college at night. She received a B.S. degree in Business from Rutgers University-Camden and attended the Edward J. Bloustein School of Planning and Public Policy (Principles of Redevelopment). She went on to earn a Master of Arts degree in Human Services Administration (MHSA) from Lincoln University (Pennsylvania).

Elected office
Redd served on the Senate's Community and Urban Affairs Committee (as vice-chair), the Budget and Appropriations Committee and the Health, Human Services and Senior Citizens Committee.  She also served on the Joint Committee on Public Schools.

Redd has served on the New Jersey Democratic State Committee as its vice chair since 2006 and on the Democratic National Committee from 2006, and was a delegate to the 2004 Democratic National Convention. She has served on the New Jersey Redistricting Commission since 2001. Redd has served on the Camden City Council as Vice Chair since 2001 and on its Housing Authority, as Chair, from 2004 to 2006.

She simultaneously held a seat in the New Jersey Senate and on the City Council. This dual position, often called double dipping, is allowed under a grandfather clause in the state law enacted by the New Jersey Legislature and signed into law by Governor of New Jersey Jon Corzine in September 2007 that prevents dual-office-holding but allows those who had held both positions as of February 1, 2008, to retain both posts. She was elected mayor of Camden in 2009.

She won the Democratic primary in June 2009 with 86% of the vote, and was the general favorite in the November  election. She won the general election on November 3, 2009, and was re-elected in 2013 for another four-year term.

References

External links
New Jersey Legislature financial disclosure forms
2007
2008

|-

|-

1968 births
Living people
African-American mayors in New Jersey
African-American state legislators in New Jersey
African-American women in politics
Bishop Eustace Preparatory School alumni
Mayors of Camden, New Jersey
New Jersey city council members
Democratic Party New Jersey state senators
Rutgers University–Camden alumni
Women mayors of places in New Jersey
Women state legislators in New Jersey
21st-century American politicians
21st-century American women politicians
21st-century African-American women
21st-century African-American politicians
20th-century African-American people
20th-century African-American women